James Ralston Kennedy "RP" Paterson, CBE, MC, MD, FRCSEd, FRCR, DMRE (Cantab) (21 May 1897 – 29 August 1981) was a radiologist and oncologist in Scotland. Along with Herbert Parker, pioneered the development of the Paterson-Parker rules for the Radium Dosage System also known as the Manchester system.

Life and Times
James Ralston Kennedy Paterson, also known as Ralston Paterson or 'RP' Paterson was born on 21 May 1897 in Edinburgh, Scotland. He attended George Heriot’s School and upon graduation served as an officer in World War I with the Argyll and Sutherland Highlanders and was decorated with the Military Cross. After the War he went back to the Royal Infirmary of Edinburgh and in 1923 awarded MB, ChB (Latin: Medicinae Baccalaureus, Baccalaureus Chirurgiae) with honors, in 1926 completed FRCSEd, and in 1927 granted the MD with commendation. At Edinburgh he met his wife and collaborator Edith Irvin Jones ("EP"). The couple had three children, David, Colin and Elspeth.

In 1925 interest with radiology led to DMRE at Cambridge. Paterson went to the Mayo Clinic for a fellowship in radiology. He received further training in radiotherapy at clinics at the University of Chicago, in Toronto and South Africa. He returned in 1930 to the Royal Infirmary of Edinburgh as acting director of the radiotherapy department.

In 1931, Paterson was appointed as radiotherapy director of the recently combined Holt Radium Institute and Christie Hospital in Manchester. Edith Paterson began her research at the Holt institute without position or salary. She in time developed her own reputation as a researcher.

In November 1943, Paterson and his wife were invited by the government of Australia including Queensland and Victoria to assist with the establishment of a cancer institute that would provide medical care and services to the community. The Australian government allocated £100,000 for an institute dedicated to cancer treatment and research, with treatment methodologies to focus on X-ray and Radium. Paterson retired in 1962 and he and his wife devoted their efforts to the running of a cattle and sheep farm at Stenreishill, near Moffat, Scotland. He died at home in his sleep. Edith would continue to run the farm until 1992.

Professional accomplishments
Peterson received numerous accolades and awards in his career.
British Association of Radiotherapists, president, 1938-1939
Founding member, Faculty of Radiologists
President, Faculty of Radiologists, President, 1943-1946
MC, 1917
MB, ChB with Honors, Edinburgh, 1923
DMRE (Cantab), Canterbury, 1924
MD with Commendation, 1927
FRCSEd, Edinburgh, 1927
FFR, 1938
FRCS, 1948
CBE, 1950
Professor of Radiotherapy, University of Manchester, 1960
Gold medal, Society of Apothecaries, 1961
President, International Radiological Congress in London, 1950
Gold Medal, Faculty of Radiologists, 1966

Legacy
Working with Herbert Parker, developed the Paterson-Parker rules for the Radium Dosage System also known as the Manchester system.
Paterson Research Laboratory

Select Publications
Paterson, Ralston, and Herbert M. Parker. (1934). "A dosage system for gamma ray therapy." The British Journal of Radiology. 7(82): 592-632.
Paterson, Ralston, and Herbert M. Parker. (1938). "A dosage system for interstitial radium therapy." The British Journal of Radiology. 11(124): 252-266.

References

British radiologists
20th-century Scottish medical doctors
1897 births
1981 deaths
People educated at George Heriot's School
Medical doctors from Edinburgh
Alumni of the University of Cambridge
Mayo Clinic people
University of Chicago alumni
Recipients of the Military Cross
Argyll and Sutherland Highlanders officers
Commanders of the Order of the British Empire
Academics of the University of Manchester
British oncologists
Military personnel from Edinburgh